Playero 37 is DJ Playero's first studio album.

Track listing
Side A: Dance Hall Mix

 OG Black
 Master Joe
 Baby J
 Master Joe
 Q Mack Daddy
 OG Black
 Baby J
 Master Joe
 B.F. Yaviah
 Gomy Man
 Master Joe
 Baby J
 OG Black
 Q Mack Daddy
 Genio
 Frankie Boy
 Buru Fast
 2 Sweet
 Blanco

Side B: Ragga Moonfin Mix

 Daddy Yankee
 Master Joe y Playero
 Fellas Rican King
 B.F. Yaviah
 DJ Playero
 2 Sweet
 Master Joe
 Fat Flavor
Playero 37: The Original

 Donde Mi No Venga, Sigan Brincando, Nunca Me Quedo Atras, Yamilette, Ya Va Sonando - Daddy Yankee
 Original Si Soy Yo - Master Joe y Playero
 From, From The Weed - Fellas Rican King
 Si Tu Quieres Fumar - B.F. Yaviah
 Mi Amor - 2 Sweet
 Vuelve Master Joe, Echa Pa' Ca, Te Gusta El Blunt, Ya (Master Joe) - Master Joe, Chino Man, Fat Flavor
 Interlude Break - DJ Playero
 Para Ti - OG Black y Q Mack Daddy
 Marijuana Quiero Fumar - Buru Fast
 Quien Dijo - Fat Flavor, Master Joe, Funkie Ed, Genio
 Hazle Un Hechizo - OG Black
 Mountain Spash - 3 On Mic
 Se Te Hundio El Barco - 3 Two Get Funky
 Quiero, Quiero - DJ Playero
 Tiempo Ya - Master Joe, O.G. Black, Q Mack Daddy, DJ Playero
 Intro - DJ Playero
 Tu No Me Lo Cortas - Ranking Stone
 Muevete Asi - Frankie Boy
 La Predilecta - OG Black
 Corre y Baila - Wiso G.
 Atencion - Master Joe
 Dame Tu Amor - Baby J, Master Joe
 La Campeona, Oyeme Mamita, Eres Tu, Listo - Q Mack Daddy, OG Black, Baby J, Master Joe
 Oye Chiquitico - B.F. Yaviah
 Impro - Gomy Man
 No Inventes - Master Joe
 Corre y Buscalo - Baby J
 37 Pa' Desordenar, Me Toca Implantar - OG Black, Q Mack Daddy
 Numero 1 - Frankie Boy
 Pedaleando - Buru Fast
 Numero 1 - 2 Sweet
 Besa Tu Cuerpo - Blanco
 Prendelo, Subelo - Lisa M.
 Yo Quiero Fumar - B.F. Yaviah y Gommy Man
 Interesada - Maicol y Manuel
 No Podras - Master Joe
 La Quiero y La Amo - Baby J
 Forma De Bailar - Daddy Yankee y Bimbo

References

DJ Playero albums
1994 albums